The 1926 Duluth Eskimos season was their fourth in the league and first season as the Eskimos. The team improved on their previous output of 0–3, winning six games. They finished eighth in the league.

Schedule

Standings

References

Duluth Eskimos seasons
Duluth Eskimos
Duluth Eskimos